Kim Seong-hyun (born March 9, 1987) is a South Korean professional baseball infielder currently playing for the SSG Landers of the KBO League

Professional career
He was selected by the SK Wyverns in the 2007 Draft (held in 2006), as an infielder.

He served in the military in 2009–2010.

In 2014, he became a regular player at shortstop. He batted .284/.376/.377 with 113 hits, 5 home runs, 43 RBIs, and 6 SBs.

In 2015, he batted .297/.357/.408 with 118 hits, 5 home runs, 48 RBIs, and 1  SB. But he recorded 23 errors, so he prepare 2016 season to Second baseman.

Converted to second baseman In 2016, he came golden days. He batted .319/.366/.418 with 153 hits, 8 HRs, 65 RBIs, and 3 SBs. Because of slump in August, he didn't win Golden Glove.

2017, he batted .271/.335/.339 with 103 hits, 4 HRs, 29RBIs, and 2SBs. He recorded only 6 errors in 980 innings, became the best defensiver in 2B.

He finished the 2018 season batting .277/.336/.357 with 115 hits, 4 HRs, 55 RBIs, and 6 SBs.

In the 2018 postseason, he hit a 3-run home run in playoff Game 1. He batted .385/.500/.769 with 1 home run. He won the daily MVP in the 2018 Korean Series Game 5. Thanks to his performance, SK Wyverns defeated Doosan Bears.

He converted to shortstop again in 2019. He appeared in every game. He batted .246/.302/.300.

External links
 from the KBO League
 at SK Wyverns Baseball Club 

SSG Landers players
KBO League infielders
South Korean baseball players
People from Gwangju
1987 births
Living people